Pierre Toubert (born 29 November 1932) is a French historian. He is a professor of medieval history at the University of Paris and the Collège de France. Focusing on medieval history, his most monumental work is Les structures du Latium médiéval : Le Latium méridional et la Sabine du IXe siècle à la fin du XIIe siècle (1973), in which he outlines an influential, in-depth study of incastellamento (in English, encastellation) in the Lazio region of Italy.

Early life
Pierre Toubert was born on 29 November 1932. He earned the agrégation in history and graduated from the École normale supérieure in 1958. He earned a PhD in 1972.

Career
Toubert was an associate professor of history at the University of Paris in 1972-1973, and he became a full professor in 1973. He is also a professor of history at the Collège de France.

Toubert was inducted into the Académie des Inscriptions et Belles-Lettres 1986. He won the Silver Medal from the Centre national de la recherche scientifique in 1973, and the Prix Augustin Thierry from the Académie française in 1995. He became an officer of the National Order of Merit in 1999, and a commander in 2010.

Works

References

Living people
1932 births
École Normale Supérieure alumni
20th-century French historians
21st-century French historians
French medievalists
Academic staff of the Collège de France
Members of the Académie des Inscriptions et Belles-Lettres
Commanders of the Ordre national du Mérite
Corresponding Fellows of the Medieval Academy of America